Irma Christenson (14 January 1915 – 21 February 1993) was a Swedish actress notable for her many roles in the Royal Dramatic Theatre in Stockholm, and in many films.

Christenson was born in the small village of Hunnebostrand. She studied at the Royal Dramatic Theatre from 1933 to 1936. 

She married the writer Per-Erik Rundquist and with him had a son, Mikael Rundquist, also an actor.

Selected filmography
 Adventure (1936)
 Emilie Högquist, 1939
Home from Babylon (1941)
Doctor Glas, 1942
 It Is My Music (1942)
 I Killed (1943)
 Gentleman with a Briefcase (1943)
 The Invisible Wall (1944)
 Live Dangerously (1944)
You Who Are About to Enter, 1945
 Maria of Kvarngarden (1945)
 The Sixth Commandment (1947)
 Neglected by His Wife (1947)
 The Loveliest Thing on Earth (1947)
Prison, 1949
 Restaurant Intim (1950)
 When Love Came to the Village (1950)
 Two Stories Up (1950)
One Summer of Happiness, 1951
Divorced, 1951
 A Goat in the Garden (1958)
The Best Intentions, 1992
Sunday's Children, 1992

Further reading

External links

1915 births
1993 deaths
People from Sotenäs Municipality
Swedish stage actresses
Swedish film actresses
Eugene O'Neill Award winners
20th-century Swedish actresses